Darrell Roy Hanson (born August 8, 1954) is an American politician in the state of Iowa.

Hanson was born in Astoria, Oregon. He attended the University of Kansas, the University of Iowa, and the University of Northern Iowa and is a university instructor. He served in the Iowa House of Representatives from 1979 to 1995, as a Republican.

References

1954 births
Living people
Politicians from Astoria, Oregon
Republican Party members of the Iowa House of Representatives
University of Kansas alumni
University of Iowa alumni
University of Northern Iowa alumni